5 is an EP collection by English singer-songwriter Ed Sheeran. It was released on 12 May 2015 via Atlantic Records and collects his five pre-fame independently-released EPs.

Track listing

Charts

References

External links

2015 compilation albums
Ed Sheeran albums